Iran Andrielle Villahaylobos de Oliveira or simply Iran (born June 14, 1979 in Boa Esperança), is a Brazilian left back.

Honours
Taça Rio: 2007

External links
 canalbotafogo.com
 sambafoot.com
 CBF

1979 births
Living people
Brazilian footballers
Mixto Esporte Clube players
Rio Claro Futebol Clube players
Atlético Clube Paranavaí players
Associação Atlética Ponte Preta players
Botafogo de Futebol e Regatas players
Sport Club Corinthians Paulista players
Associação Desportiva São Caetano players
Campinense Clube players
Association football defenders